Crepis acuminata is a North American species of flowering plant in the family Asteraceae known by the common name tapertip hawksbeard. It is native to the western United States where it grows in many types of open habitat.

Description
Crepis acuminata is a perennial herb producing a woolly, branching stem up to about 70 centimeters (28 inches) tall from a taproot.

The longest, near the base of the plant, may reach  in length. The inflorescence is an open array of flower heads at the top of the stem branches. The flower head opens into a face of up to 10 yellow ray florets. There are no disc florets.

Distribution and habitat
It is native from eastern Washington and eastern California to central Montana, Colorado, and northern New Mexico. It can be found in dry and open areas in sagebrush habitats and coniferous forests.

References

External links

Calflora Database:  Crepis acuminata (Long leaved hawk's beard, Tapertip hawksbeard)
 Jepson Manual eFlora (TJM2) treatment of Crepis acuminata
United States Department of Agriculture Plants Profile for Crepis acuminata
UC Calphotos gallery: Crepis acuminata

acuminata
Flora of the Western United States
Flora of California
Flora of the Great Basin
Flora of the Rocky Mountains
Flora of the Sierra Nevada (United States)
Plants described in 1841
Taxa named by Thomas Nuttall
Flora without expected TNC conservation status